Marehra, is a city and a municipal board in Etah district in the state of Uttar Pradesh, India. Marehra is famous worldwide for Sufi Syed Shah Barkatullah. Marehra is also famous for the temple of Lord Hanuman, where the statue of Hanuman is the highest in the district Etah. Marehra was once called Swaroopganj. Books written about the history of Etah mention that the village of Swaroopganj was destroyed by the forces of Allauddin Khilji.

Later, on the orders of Alauddin Khilji, Rajput Hakim Muniram restored the town again. It is said that once the settlement was established, the town was named Marhara (Mara-Hara).

Geography
Other important cities near Marehra are Kasganj (15 km), Aligarh (60 km) and Agra (100 km).

Demographics
As of 2011 India census, Marehra had a population of 19,542. Males constitute 53% of the population and females 47%. Marehra has an average literacy rate of 51%, lower than the national average of 59.5%; male literacy is 60%, and female literacy is 40%. 15.7% of the population is under 6 years of age. Marehra is a state legislative assembly constituency  of Uttar Pradesh. This seat is called 105 Marehra Vidhansabha. Marehra, also known as Marehra Shareef, is a noted pilgrimage site for Sunni Muslims.

References

Cities and towns in Etah district